Khmelnytskyi Airport (Міжнародний аеропорт "Хмельницький)  is an airport in Ukraine located 7 km southwest of Khmelnytskyi.  It services general aviation.

See also
 List of airports in Ukraine
 List of the busiest airports in Ukraine

References
RussianAirFields.com

1952 establishments in Ukraine
2010s disestablishments in Ukraine
Airports built in the Soviet Union
Defunct airports in Ukraine